A vagrant is a person who lives without a home or regular employment and wanders from place to place.

Vagrant or vagrancy may also refer to:

Biology

Concepts
 Vagrancy (biology), the state of roaming or growing far outside of ones species' usual range
 Vagrant lichen, a lichen that is (or can become) unattached from a substrate, yet continue to flourish

Insects

Butterflies
 Catopsilia florella, a species in the family Pieridae known as the common vagrant
 Eronia, a genus in the family Pieridae commonly known as the vagrants
 Eronia cleodora, a species commonly known as the vine-leaf vagrant
 Eronia leda, a species commonly known as the autumn leaf vagrant
 Nepheronia, another genus of Pieridae commonly known as (plain) vagrants
 Nepheronia argia, an African species known as the large vagrant
 Nepheronia thalassina, a species known as the Cambridge vagrant
 Nepheronia pharis, a species known as the round-winged vagrant
 Vagrans egista, a South and Southeast Asian species in the family Nymphalidae commonly known as the vagrant

Dragonflies
 Hemianax ephippiger, an African species of dragonfly in the family Aeshnidae commonly known as the vagrant emperor
 Vagrant darter, (Sympetrum vulgatum), a European dragonfly

Other uses in biology
 Vagrant shrew, a genus of medium-sized shrews found in North America
 Uliodon, a genus of spiders found in New Zealand and Australia and commonly referred to as vagrant spiders

Media

Music
 The Vagrants, a mid-sixties Long Island rock and blue-eyed soul band
 Vagrant Records, an indie rock record label, founded in 1996

Film
 The Vagrant (film), a 1992 comedy film starring Bill Paxton
 Vagrant Bus, a 1990 Soviet film, written by Iosif Kheifits and directed by Lyudmila Razumovskaya

Other uses in media
The Vagrant (TV series), a 2002 Singapore TV series
 Vagrant Story, a 2000 PlayStation game, developed by Square
 The Vagrants (novel), a novel by Yiyun Li

Other uses
 Vagrancy (racehorse), an American racehorse
 Vagrant (software), for creating and configuring virtual development environments, in technology
 Vagrant (racehorse), an American racehorse, winner of the 1876 Kentucky Derby
 Vagrant Island, Graham Land, Antarctica
 Vagrant predicate, logical constructions that exhibit an inherent limit to conceptual knowledge
 ST Vagrant, a tugboat
 Bụi đời (Vietnamese for "dust of life"), vagrants in the city
 Rogue (vagrant), a person who wanders from place to place

See also
 Vagabond (disambiguation)
 Wandering (disambiguation)
 
 
 
 

Animal common name disambiguation pages